The 1937 Colorado Buffaloes football team was an American football team that represented the University of Colorado as a member of the Rocky Mountain Conference (RMC) during the 1937 college football season. Led by third-year head coach Bunny Oakes, the Buffaloes won all eight games in the regular season, with a 7–0 mark in conference play, winning the RMC title. Ranked seventeenth, undefeated Colorado was invited to the Cotton Bowl in Dallas on New Year's Day, but lost to No. 18 Rice to finish at 8–1. This was the CU program's final year in the RMC, as they moved to the Mountain States Conference the following year.

Senior back Byron "Whizzer" White, a Rhodes scholar and future justice of the U.S. Supreme Court, was a consensus All-American, the runner-up for the Heisman Trophy, and the fourth overall pick of the 1938 NFL Draft.

Schedule

References

Colorado
Colorado Buffaloes football seasons
Rocky Mountain Athletic Conference football champion seasons
Colorado Buffaloes football